Plesko is a small settlement in the Municipality of Hrastnik in central Slovenia. It lies in the hills between Hrastnik and Trbovlje. The area is part of the traditional region of Styria. It is now included with the rest of the municipality in the Central Sava Statistical Region.

References

External links
Plesko on Geopedia

Populated places in the Municipality of Hrastnik